Air Force is a male professional volleyball team based in Don Mueang District, Bangkok, Thailand. The club was founded in 2016 and plays in the Volleyball Thailand League. The club is want to play 
replace it of Chonburi E-Tech Air Force.

Honours
Domestic competitions
Thailand League :
  Champion (2): 2016–17, 2018–19
  Runner-up (1):  2017–18
 Thai-Denmark Super League :
  Champion (1): 2018
  Runner-up (2): 2017, 2019
 Academy League U18 Thailand League
  Champion (1): 2017
International competitions
 Asian Club Championship 2 appearances
 2019 — Est colar representative
 2017 — 9th
 Hoa Lu Cup 1 appearances
 2016 —   Champion

League results

Current squad 
As of December 2020

Head coach:  Sonthi Boonrueng

Head coach

Imports

Notable players

Domestic Players

 Jirayu Raksakaew (loan)
 Kittikun Sriutthawong (loan)
 Montri Vaenpradab (loan)
 Yuranan Buadang (loan)
 Saranchit Charoensuk
 Yutthakarn Boonrat
 Piyarat Tunthapthai
 Saran Jaruwat
 Pacharaphon Phoungbubpa
 Kissada Nilsawai
 Jakraprop Saengsee
 Kantapat Koonmee

Foreigner Players

 Henry Chan (2016)

 Yosuke Arai (2018)

 Kanybek Uulu Onelbek (2017–2018)
 Roman Shirov (2018–2019)
 Temir Musa Uulu (2019–2020)

 Janitha Surath (2017–2018,2019)

 Muhammad Waseem (2019–2020)

References

External links
 

Volleyball clubs in Thailand
Men's volleyball teams
2016 establishments in Thailand
Volleyball clubs established in 2016